A Chain of Voices is a 1982 novel by Afrikaans writer André Brink. The novel is a historical novel which recounts the roots of the apartheid system during the early part of the 19th century. The novel focuses on a slave revolt center in the country north-east of Cape Town. The novel uses a coalition of voices, representing the whole range of social groups in South Africa.

Reception 
The New York Times reviewer Julian Moynahan called the novel the best novel he had read since Robert Stone's A Flag for Sunrise and described it as "massive and ambitious, and surpassing Brink's previous apartheid novel A Dry White Season.

References

Further reading 
 
 

1982 novels
Fiction set in the 1830s
Afrikaans literature
20th-century South African novels
Historical novels
Novels set in South Africa
Novels by André Brink
Faber and Faber books